Kang Chae-young (Hangul: 강채영, born 8 June 1996) is a South Korean archer competing in women's recurve events. She has won numerous medals in archery competitions.

Career 

At the 2017 Summer Universiade held in Taipei, Taiwan, she won the gold medal in the women's individual recurve and women's team recurve events. In the same year, she also won the gold medals in the team and mixed team events at the 2017 World Archery Championships held in Mexico City, Mexico.

In 2018, she represented South Korea at the 2018 Asian Games in Jakarta, Indonesia and she won two medals: the bronze medal in the women's individual recurve event and the gold medal in the women's team recurve event.

In 2019, she won the gold medal in the women's recurve event in the final of the 2019 Archery World Cup. This was her first Archery World Cup final. She also won the stages of the competition held in both Medellín, Colombia and Shanghai, China. At the 2019 World Archery Championships, she broke the world record for the 70m ranking round with a score of 692, before medalling in the individual, mixed team and team events. In that same year, she won the gold medal in the women's individual, women's team and mixed team events at the 2019 Asian Archery Championships held in Bangkok, Thailand.

In 2020, she won the 2019 World Archery Athlete of the Year award in the recurve women's category.

In 2021, she qualified in first place for the South Korean women's team nominated to the 2020 Summer Olympics in Tokyo, Japan and won the gold medal in the women's team event. Two months later, she also won the gold medal in the women's team event at the 2021 World Archery Championships held in Yankton, United States.

Her nickname is "The Destroyer."

References

External links 

 

Living people
1996 births
Sportspeople from Ulsan
South Korean female archers
World Archery Championships medalists
Universiade medalists in archery
Universiade gold medalists for South Korea
Universiade silver medalists for South Korea
Medalists at the 2015 Summer Universiade
Medalists at the 2017 Summer Universiade
Medalists at the 2019 Summer Universiade
Asian Games medalists in archery
Archers at the 2018 Asian Games
Asian Games gold medalists for South Korea
Asian Games bronze medalists for South Korea
Medalists at the 2018 Asian Games
Archers at the 2020 Summer Olympics
Olympic archers of South Korea
Olympic medalists in archery
Olympic gold medalists for South Korea
Medalists at the 2020 Summer Olympics
21st-century South Korean women